Chemmanthatta Mahadeva Temple is a Hindu temple located in Chemmanthatta, Thrissur District. According to folklore, sage Parashurama has installed the idol. It is the part of the 108 Shiva temples of Kerala. Kerala urayma devasom board and kshethrakshema samidhi chemmanthatta control the temple.

References

108 Shiva Temples
Shiva temples in Kerala
Hindu temples in Thrissur district
Monuments of National Importance in Kerala